The William Phaup House is a historic home located in Lynchburg, Virginia.  It is a modest two story, four bay Federal style brick dwelling constructed about 1817.  It is named after its architect and original occupant, William Phaup. Very few alterations have been made to the house since its construction.

It was listed on the National Register of Historic Places in 2002.   It is located in the Fifth Street Historic District.

References

External links
William Phaup House, Sixth Street between Jackson & Polk Streets, Lynchburg, VA: 1 photos, 1 data page, and 1 photo caption page, at Historic American Buildings Survey

Historic American Buildings Survey in Virginia
Houses on the National Register of Historic Places in Virginia
Federal architecture in Virginia
Houses completed in 1817
Houses in Lynchburg, Virginia
National Register of Historic Places in Lynchburg, Virginia
Individually listed contributing properties to historic districts on the National Register in Virginia